Hakeem Fateh Mohammad Sehwani was born in 1882 at Sehwan Sharif, the then Dadu District and now in Jamshoro District, Sindh. He was great scholar, poet, literary, journalist and politician of Sindh. He died on 13 December 1942.

Education
Sehwani received education in Persian and Arabic languages. He became student of Molvi Mohammad Umer Channa and Molvi Atta Mohammad at Mehar, the then well named teachers of Sindh. At the age of 21, he qualified from Madrasa. He opened his own Madrasa at Shah Sadar, Sewhan and practiced as Tibb (Hakeem), which was his ancestral profession.

Professional career
Within short period of time, Hakeem Fateh Mohammad Sehwani was appointed as teacher of Persian at a Madarsa, owned by Syed Allah Aando Shah.

Political career
Hakeem Sehwani took part in political activities under the guidance of Syed Allah Aando Shah. Sehwani would say, “A man without a political insight is like a body without a soul”.

He was one of the main leaders of Jamiat Ulema-e-Hind and a major opponent of the British Empire in the Indian subcontinent. He also remained secretary of Jamiat ul Ulima (Sindh). Molana sahab was active worker and secretary of Khilafat Movement in Sindh. He opened a moderate Madarsa for teaching Arabic and Persian languages and a Matabb at Karachi, which was a place of gathering for party workers.

Literary career
Sehwani was an unyielding journalist. He published a magazine Al Islam and Aljamia from Karachi in 1925. Al Jamia was published in three languages, Sindhi, English and Arabic, all at a time. He used simple and proverbial Sindhi in his poetry and prose.

Publications
Hakeem Fateh Mohammad Sehwani wrote on various topics. His book “Bahar e Ikhlaq” is collection of poems. He formerly used “Sagheer” and late “Hakeem” as his pen name. He also composed nationalistic poetry.

Religiously he belonged to the Deobandi school of thought. Doing charity and favour to people was his hobby. Some of his works are: Hayat e Nabi (S.A.W), Ikhlaq e Mohammadi (S.A.W), Fatheh Mohammadi (S.A.W), Dastan e Qoum, Ahwal Lal Shahbaz Qalander, Meeran ji Sahibi.

Recognition
The Government of Sindh recognized his eternal services and in his remembrance, some primary schools were named after him.

Death
Hakeem Fateh Mohammad Sehwani died on 13 December 1942.

References

1882 births
1942 deaths
Sindhi-language poets